Filip Lăzăreanu (born 5 July 1981) is a Romanian former footballer who played as a goalkeeper for teams such as Universitatea Cluj, Bihor Oradea, Petrolul Ploiești or Sănătatea Cluj, among others. His father, Marcel Lăzăreanu, was also a goalkeeper.

References

External links

Profile at HLSZ 

1981 births
Living people
Romanian footballers
Association football goalkeepers
FC Universitatea Cluj players
CFR Cluj players
FC Bihor Oradea players
FC Petrolul Ploiești players
Nyíregyháza Spartacus FC players
Kecskeméti TE players
FC Botoșani players
ACF Gloria Bistrița players
FC UTA Arad players
Romanian expatriate footballers
Expatriate footballers in Hungary
Romanian expatriate sportspeople in Hungary
Liga I players
Liga II players
Liga III players
Nemzeti Bajnokság I players
Sportspeople from Cluj-Napoca